Richard Morris (1869 – 26 September 1956) was a British Liberal Party politician.

He was elected at the 1918 general election as Member of Parliament (MP) for Member of Parliament for the new Northern division of Battersea. Standing as a Coalition Liberal without a Conservative opponent, he won 66.6% of the votes. He did not contest the  1922 general election, when in a 3-way contest the seat was won by Shapurji Saklatvala, a Communist Party member standing with the endorsement of the Labour Party.

References

External links 

1869 births
1956 deaths
Liberal Party (UK) MPs for English constituencies
UK MPs 1918–1922